The 2015–16 Cal Poly Mustangs men's basketball team represented the California Polytechnic State University in the 2015–16 NCAA Division I men's basketball season. They were led by seventh year head coach Joe Callero and played their home games at Mott Athletic Center. They were members of the Big West Conference. They finished the season 10–20, 4–12 in Big West play to finish in eighth place. They lost in the quarterfinals of the Big West tournament to UC Irvine.

Previous season
The Mustangs finished 13–16, 6–10 in Big West play to finish in seventh place. They lost in the first round of the Big West tournament where they lost to UC Santa Barbara.

Departures

Pre-season

Roster

Schedule and results

|-
!colspan=9 style="background:#123C31; color:#FFF1D0;"| Exhibition

|-
!colspan=9 style="background:#123C31; color:#FFF1D0;"| Non-conference regular season

|-
!colspan=9 style="background:#123C31; color:#FFF1D0;"| Big West regular season

|-
!colspan=9 style="background:#123C31; color:#FFF1D0;"| Big West tournament

See also
2015–16 Cal Poly Mustangs women's basketball team

References

Cal Poly Mustangs men's basketball seasons
Cal Poly
Cal Poly Mustangs men's basketball team
Cal Poly Mustangs men's basketball team